Crossgate or Cross Gate may refer to:

Crossgate AG, International B2B Company
Crossgate, County Durham, England
Crossgate, Kentucky, United States
Cross Gate, an online role-playing game
A railroad crossing gate, see Level crossing
Crossgate Farmhouse, Cornwall, England

See also
Crossgates (disambiguation)